Pannu is a sub-caste of Jats.

Notable people
Notable people with the surname, who may or may not be affiliated to the sub-caste, include:

Arpit Pannu
Jatinder Pannu
Kahan Singh Pannu
Kulwant Singh Pannu
Raj Pannu
Sartaj Singh Pannu
Shankar Pannu
Taapsee Pannu

References

Pannu
Pannu